The 1953 Kilkenny Senior Hurling Championship was the 59th staging of the Kilkenny Senior Hurling Championship since its establishment by the Kilkenny County Board.

On 29 November 1953, Bennettsbridge won the championship after a 3-11 to 3-06 defeat of Slieverue in the final. It was their third championship title overall and their second title in succession.

Results

Final

References

Kilkenny Senior Hurling Championship
Kilkenny Senior Hurling Championship